The Tetragrammaton, or the Tetragram, is the four-letter Hebrew theonym  (transliterated as YHWH), the name of God in the Hebrew Bible. The four letters, written and read from right to left (in Hebrew), are yodh, he, waw, and he. The name may be derived from a verb that means "to be", "to exist", "to cause to become", or "to come to pass". While there is no consensus about the structure and etymology of the name, the form Yahweh is now accepted almost universally, though the vocalization Jehovah continues to have wide usage.

The books of the Torah and the rest of the Hebrew Bible except Esther, Ecclesiastes, and (with a possible instance of the short form  in verse 8:6) the Song of Songs contain this Hebrew name. Observant Jews and those who follow Talmudic Jewish traditions do not pronounce  nor do they read aloud proposed transcription forms such as Yahweh or Yehovah; instead they replace it with a different term, whether in addressing or referring to the God of Israel. Common substitutions in Hebrew are Adonai ("My Lord") or Elohim (literally "gods" but treated as singular when meaning "God") in prayer, or HaShem ("The Name") in everyday speech.

Four letters 
The letters, properly written and read from right to left (in Biblical Hebrew), are:

Origins

Etymology
The Tetragrammaton is not attested other than among the Israelites, and seems not to have any plausible etymology. The Hebrew Bible explains it by the formula Ehye ašer ehye ("I Am that I Am"), the name of God revealed to Moses in Exodus 3:14. This would frame Y-H-W-H as a derivation from the Hebrew triconsonantal root היה (h-y-h), "to be, become, come to pass", with a third person masculine y- prefix, equivalent to English "he", thereby affording translations as "he who causes to exist", "he who is", etc.; although this would elicit the form Y-H-Y-H (יהיה‎), not Y-H-W-H. To rectify this, some scholars proposed that the Tetragrammaton represents a substitution of the medial y for w, an occasionally attested practice in Biblical Hebrew as both letters represented matres lectionis; others proposed that the Tetragrammaton derived instead from the triconsonantal root הוה (h-w-h), "to be, constitute", with the final form eliciting similar translations as those derived from h-y-h.

Modern scholars, however, consider Ehye ašer ehye to be a folk etymology; a later theological gloss invented at a time when the original meaning of the Tetragrammaton had been forgotten.

Vocalisation

YHWH and Hebrew script

Like all letters in the Hebrew script, the letters in YHWH originally indicated consonants. In unpointed Biblical Hebrew, most vowels are not written, but some are indicated ambiguously, as certain letters came to have a secondary function indicating vowels (similar to the Latin use of I and V to indicate either the consonants /j, w/ or the vowels /i, u/). Therefore, it can be difficult to deduce how a word is pronounced from its spelling, and each of the four letters in the Tetragrammaton can individually serve as a mater lectionis.

Several centuries later, between the 5th through 10th centuries CE, the original consonantal text of the Hebrew Bible was provided with vowel marks by the Masoretes to assist reading. In places where the word to be read (the qere) differed from that indicated by the consonants of the written text (the ketiv), they wrote the qere in the margin as a note showing what was to be read. In such a case the vowel marks of the qere were written on the ketiv. For a few frequent words, the marginal note was omitted: these are called qere perpetuum.

One of the frequent cases was the Tetragrammaton, which according to later Rabbinite Jewish practices should not be pronounced but read as "Adonai" (/"my Lord"), or, if the previous or next word already was Adonai, as "Elohim" (/"God").
Writing the vowel diacritics of these two words on the consonants YHVH produces  and  respectively, ghost-words that would spell "Yehovah" and "Yehovih" respectively.

The oldest complete or nearly complete manuscripts of the Masoretic Text with Tiberian vocalisation, such as the Aleppo Codex and the Leningrad Codex, both of the 10th or 11th century, mostly write  (yhwah), with no pointing on the first h. It could be because the o diacritic point plays no useful role in distinguishing between Adonai and Elohim and so is redundant, or it could point to the qere being  (šəmâ), which is Aramaic for "the Name".

Yahweh

The scholarly consensus is that the original pronunciation of the Tetragrammaton was Yahweh: "The strong consensus of biblical scholarship is that the original pronunciation of the name YHWH ... was Yahweh." R. R. Reno agrees that, when in the late first millennium Jewish scholars inserted indications of vowels into the Hebrew Bible, they signalled that what was pronounced was "Adonai" (Lord); non-Jews later combined the vowels of Adonai with the consonants of the Tetragrammaton and invented the name "Jehovah". Paul Joüon and Takamitsu Muraoka state: "The Qre is  the Lord, whilst the Ktiv is probably  (according to ancient witnesses)", and they add: "Note 1: In our translations, we have used Yahweh, a form widely accepted by scholars, instead of the traditional Jehovah." Already in 1869, when, as shown by the use of the then traditional form "Jehovah" as title for its article on the question, the present strong consensus that the original pronunciation was "Yahweh" had not yet attained full force, Smith's Bible Dictionary, a collaborative work of noted scholars of the time, declared: "Whatever, therefore, be the true pronunciation of the word, there can be little doubt that it is not Jehovah." Thomas Römer holds that "the original pronunciation of Yhwh was 'Yahô' or 'Yahû. Max Reisel, in The Mysterious Name of YHWH, says that the “vocalisation of the Tetragrammaton must originally have been YeHūàH or YaHūàH.”

The adoption at the time of the Protestant Reformation of "Jehovah" in place of the traditional "Lord" in some new translations, vernacular or Latin, of the biblical Tetragrammaton stirred up dispute about its correctness. In 1711, Adriaan Reland published a book containing the text of 17th-century writings, five attacking and five defending it. As critical of the use of "Jehovah" it incorporated writings by Johannes van den Driesche (1550–1616), known as Drusius; Sixtinus Amama (1593–1629); Louis Cappel (1585–1658); Johannes Buxtorf (1564–1629); Jacob Alting (1618–1679). Defending "Jehovah" were writings by Nicholas Fuller (1557–1626) and Thomas Gataker (1574–1654) and three essays by Johann Leusden (1624–1699). The opponents of "Jehovah" said that the Tetragrammaton should be pronounced as "Adonai" and in general do not speculate on what may have been the original pronunciation, although mention is made of the fact that some held that Jahve was that pronunciation.

Almost two centuries after the 17th-century works reprinted by Reland, 19th-century Wilhelm Gesenius reported in his Thesaurus Philologicus on the main reasoning of those who argued either for /Yah[w]oh or /Yahweh as the original pronunciation of the Tetragrammaton, as opposed to /Yehovah, citing explicitly as supporters of  the 17th-century writers mentioned by Reland and implicitly Johann David Michaelis (1717–1791) and Johann Friedrich von Meyer (1772–1849), the latter of whom Johann Heinrich Kurtz described as the last of those "who have maintained with great pertinacity that  was the correct and original pointing". Edward Robinson's translation of a work by Gesenius, gives Gesenius' personal view as: "My own view coincides with that of those who regard this name as anciently pronounced [/Yahweh] like the Samaritans."

Non-biblical texts

Texts with Tetragrammaton 

The oldest known inscription of the Tetragrammaton dates to 840 BCE: the Mesha Stele mentions the Israelite god Yahweh.

Of the same century are two pottery sherds found at Kuntillet Ajrud with inscriptions mentioning "Yahweh of Samaria and his Asherah" and "Yahweh of Teman and his Asherah". A tomb inscription at Khirbet el-Qom also mentions Yahweh. Dated slightly later (7th century BCE) there are an ostracon from the collections of Shlomo Moussaieff, and two tiny silver amulet scrolls found at Ketef Hinnom that mention Yahweh. Also a wall inscription, dated to the late 6th century BCE, with mention of Yahweh had been found in a tomb at Khirbet Beit Lei.

Yahweh is mentioned also in the Lachish letters (587 BCE) and the slightly earlier Tel Arad ostraca, and on a stone from Mount Gerizim (3rd or the beginning of the 2nd century BCE).

Texts with similar theonyms 

The theonyms YHW and YHH are found in the Elephantine papyri of about 500 BCE. One ostracon with YH is thought to have lost the final letter of an original YHW. These texts are in Aramaic, not the language of the Hebrew Tetragrammaton (YHWH) and, unlike the Tetragrammaton, are of three letters, not four. However, because they were written by Jews, they are assumed to refer to the same deity and to be either an abbreviated form of the Tetragrammaton or the original name from which the name YHWH developed.

Kristin De Troyer says that YHW or YHH, and also YH, are attested in the fifth and fourth-century BCE papyri from Elephantine and Wadi Daliyeh: "In both collections one can read the name of God as Yaho (or Yahu) and Ya". The name YH (Yah/Jah), the first syllable of "Yahweh", appears 50 times in the Old Testament, 26 times alone (Exodus 15:2; 17:16; and 24 times in the Psalms), 24 times in the expression "Hallelujah".

An Egyptian hieroglyphic inscription of the Pharaoh Amenhotep III (1402–1363 BCE) mentions a group of Shasu whom it calls "the Shasu of Yhw³" (read as: ja-h-wi or ja-h-wa). James D. G. Dunn and John W. Rogerson tentatively suggest that the Amenhotep III inscription may indicate that worship of Yahweh originated in an area to the southeast of Palestine. A later inscription from the time of Ramesses II (1279–1213 BCE) in West Amara associates the Shasu nomads with S-rr, interpreted as Mount Seir, spoken of in some texts as where Yahweh comes from. Frank Moore Cross says: "It must be emphasized that the Amorite verbal form is of interest only in attempting to reconstruct the proto-Hebrew or South Canaanite verbal form used in the name Yahweh. We should argue vigorously against attempts to take Amorite yuhwi and yahu as divine epithets." Thomas Schneider argued for the existence of a theophoric name in a Book of the Dead papyrus dating to the late 18th or early 19th dynasty which he translated as ‘adōnī-rō‘ē-yāh, meaning “My lord is the shepherd of Yah”.

According to De Troyer, the short names, instead of being ineffable like "Yahweh", seem to have been in spoken use not only as elements of personal names but also in reference to God: "The Samaritans thus seem to have pronounced the Name of God as Jaho or Ja." She cites Theodoret (c. 393 – c. 460) as that the shorter names of God were pronounced by the Samaritans as "Iabe" and by the Jews as "Ia". She adds that the Bible also indicates that the short form "Yah" was spoken, as in the phrase "Halleluyah".

The Patrologia Graeca texts of Theodoret differ slightly from what De Troyer says. In Quaestiones in Exodum 15 he says that Samaritans pronounced the name Ἰαβέ and Jews the name Άϊά. (The Greek term Άϊά is a transcription of the Exodus 3:14 phrase אֶהְיֶה (ehyeh), "I am".) In Haereticarum Fabularum Compendium 5.3, he uses the spelling Ἰαβαί.

Magical papyri 
Among the Jews in the Second Temple Period magical amulets became very popular. Representations of the Tetragrammaton name or combinations inspired by it in languages such as Greek and Coptic, giving some indication of its pronunciation, occur as names of powerful agents in Jewish magical papyri found in Egypt.  Iave and  Yaba occurs frequently, "apparently the Samaritan enunciation of the tetragrammaton YHWH (Yahweh)".

The most commonly invoked god is Ιαω (Iaō), another vocalization of the tetragrammaton YHWH. There is a single instance of the heptagram  (iaōouēe).

Yāwē is found in an Ethiopian Christian list of magical names of Jesus, purporting to have been taught by him to his disciples.

Vernacular evidence 

Also relevant is the use of the name in theophoric names; there is a common Hebrew prefix form, Yeho or "Yehō-", and a common suffix form, "Yahū" or "-Yehū". These provide some corroborating evidence of how YHWH was pronounced.

Hebrew Bible

Masoretic Text 
According to the Jewish Encyclopedia it occurs 5,410 times in the Hebrew scriptures. In the Hebrew Bible, the Tetragrammaton occurs 6828 times, as can be seen in Kittel's Biblia Hebraica and the Biblia Hebraica Stuttgartensia. In addition, the marginal notes or masorah indicate that in another 134 places, where the received text has the word Adonai, an earlier text had the Tetragrammaton. which would add up to 142 additional occurrences. Even in the Dead Sea Scrolls practice varied with regard to use of the Tetragrammaton.

The first appearance of the Tetragrammaton is in the Book of Genesis 2:4. The only books it does not appear in are Ecclesiastes, the Book of Esther, and Song of Songs.

In the Book of Esther the Tetragrammaton does not appear, but it has been distinguished acrostic-wise in the initial or last letters of four consecutive words, as indicated in Est 7:5 by writing the four letters in red in at least three ancient Hebrew manuscripts.

The short form /Yah (a digrammaton) "occurs 50 times if the phrase hallellu-Yah is included": 43 times in the Psalms, once in Exodus 15:2; 17:16; Isaiah 12:2; 26:4, and twice in Isaiah 38:11.

Other short forms are found as a component of theophoric Hebrew names in the Bible: jô- or jehô- (29 names) and -jāhû or -jāh (127 jnames). A form of jāhû/jehô appears in the name Elioenai (Elj(eh)oenai) in 1Ch 3:23–24; 4:36; 7:8; Ezr 22:22, 27; Neh 12:41.

The following graph shows the absolute number of occurrences of the Tetragrammaton (6828 in all) in the books in the Masoretic Text, without relation to the length of the books.

Leningrad Codex 
The close transcriptions do not indicate that the Masoretes intended the name to be pronounced in that way (see qere perpetuum).

ĕ is hataf segol; ǝ is the pronounced form of plain shva.

Dead Sea Scrolls 
In the Dead Sea Scrolls and other Hebrew and Aramaic texts the Tetragrammaton and some other names of God in Judaism (such as El or Elohim) were sometimes written in paleo-Hebrew script, showing that they were treated specially. Most of God's names were pronounced until about the 2nd century BCE. Then, as a tradition of non-pronunciation of the names developed, alternatives for the Tetragrammaton appeared, such as Adonai, Kurios and Theos. The 4Q120, a Greek fragment of Leviticus (26:2–16) discovered in the Dead Sea scrolls (Qumran) has ιαω ("Iao"), the Greek form of the Hebrew trigrammaton YHW. The historian John the Lydian (6th century) wrote: "The Roman Varro [116–27 BCE] defining him [that is the Jewish God] says that he is called Iao in the Chaldean mysteries" (De Mensibus IV 53). Van Cooten mentions that Iao is one of the "specifically Jewish designations for God" and "the Aramaic papyri from the Jews at Elephantine show that 'Iao' is an original Jewish term".

The preserved manuscripts from Qumran show the inconsistent practice of writing the Tetragrammaton, mainly in biblical quotations: in some manuscripts is written in paleo-Hebrew script, square scripts or replaced with four dots or dashes (tetrapuncta).

The members of the Qumran community were aware of the existence of the Tetragrammaton, but this was not tantamount to granting consent for its existing use and speaking. This is evidenced not only by special treatment of the Tetragrammaton in the text, but by the recommendation recorded in the 'Rule of Association' (VI, 27): "Who will remember the most glorious name, which is above all [...]".

The table below presents all the manuscripts in which the Tetragrammaton is written in paleo-Hebrew script, in square scripts, and all the manuscripts in which the copyists have used tetrapuncta.

Copyists used the 'tetrapuncta' apparently to warn against pronouncing the name of God. In the manuscript number 4Q248 is in the form of bars.

Septuagint 

Editions of the Septuagint Old Testament are based on the complete or almost complete fourth-century manuscripts Codex Vaticanus, Codex Sinaiticus and Codex Alexandrinus and consistently use Κύριος, "Lord", where the Masoretic Text has the Tetragrammaton in Hebrew. This corresponds with the Jewish practice of replacing the Tetragrammaton with "Adonai" when reading the Hebrew word.

However, five of the oldest manuscripts now extant (in fragmentary form) render the Tetragrammaton into Greek in a different way.

Two of these are of the first century BCE: Papyrus Fouad 266 uses  in the normal Hebrew alphabet in the midst of its Greek text, and 4Q120 uses the Greek transcription of the name, ΙΑΩ. Three later manuscripts use , the name  in Paleo-Hebrew script: the Greek Minor Prophets Scroll from Nahal Hever, Papyrus Oxyrhynchus 3522 and Papyrus Oxyrhynchus 5101.

Other extant ancient fragments of Septuagint or Old Greek manuscripts provide no evidence on the use of the Tetragrammaton, Κύριος, or ΙΑΩ in correspondence with the Hebrew-text Tetragrammaton. They include the oldest known example, Papyrus Rylands 458.

Scholars differ on whether in the original Septuagint translations the Tetragrammaton was represented by Κύριος, by ΙΑΩ, by the Tetragrammaton in either normal or Paleo-Hebrew form, or whether different translators used different forms in different books.

Frank Shaw argues that the Tetragrammaton continued to be articulated until the second or third century CE and that the use of Ιαω was by no means limited to magical or mystical formulas, but was still normal in more elevated contexts such as that exemplified by Papyrus 4Q120. Shaw considers all theories that posit in the Septuagint a single original form of the divine name as merely based on a priori assumptions. Accordingly, he declares: "The matter of any (especially single) 'original' form of the divine name in the LXX is too complex, the evidence is too scattered and indefinite, and the various approaches offered for the issue are too simplistic" to account for the actual scribal practices (p. 158). He holds that the earliest stages of the LXX's translation were marked by diversity (p. 262), with the choice of certain divine names depending on the context in which they appear (cf. Gen 4:26; Exod 3:15; 8:22; 28:32; 32:5; and 33:19). He treats of the related blank spaces in some Septuagint manuscripts and the setting of spaces around the divine name in 4Q120 and Papyrus Fouad 266b (p. 265), and repeats that "there was no one 'original' form but different translators had different feelings, theological beliefs, motivations, and practices when it came to their handling of the name" (p. 271). His view has won the support of Anthony R. Meyer, Bob Becking, and (commenting on Shaw's 2011 dissertation on the subject) D.T. Runia.

Mogens Müller says that, while no clearly Jewish manuscript of the Septuagint has been found with Κύριος representing the Tetragrammaton, other Jewish writings of the time show that Jews did use the term Κύριος for God, and it was because Christians found it in the Septuagint that they were able to apply it to Christ. In fact, the deuterocanonical books of the Septuagint, written originally in Greek (e.g., Wisdom, 2 and 3 Maccabees), do speak of God as Κύριος and thus show that "the use of κύριος as a representation of  must be pre-Christian in origin".

Similarly, while consistent use of Κύριος to represent the Tetragrammaton has been called "a distinguishing mark for any Christian LXX manuscript", Eugen J. Pentiuc says: "No definitive conclusion has been reached thus far." And Sean McDonough denounces as implausible the idea that Κύριος did not appear in the Septuagint before the Christian era.

Speaking of the Greek Minor Prophets Scroll from Nahal Hever, which is a kaige recension of the Septuagint, "a revision of the Old Greek text to bring it closer to the Hebrew text of the Bible as it existed in ca. 2nd-1st century BCE" (and thus not necessarily the original text), Kristin De Troyer remarks: "The problem with a recension is that one does not know what is the original form and what the recension. Hence, is the paleo-Hebrew Tetragrammaton secondary – a part of the recension – or proof of the Old Greek text? This debate has not yet been solved."

While some interpret the presence of the Tetragrammaton in Papyrus Fouad 266, the oldest Septuagint manuscript in which it appears, as an indication of what was in the original text, others see this manuscript as "an archaizing and hebraizing revision of the earlier translation κύριος". Of this papyrus, De Troyer asks: "Is it a recension or not?" In this regard she says that Emanuel Tov notes that in this manuscript a second scribe inserted the four-letter Tetragrammaton where the first scribe left spaces large enough for the six-letter word Κύριος, and that Pietersma and Hanhart say the papyrus "already contains some pre-hexaplaric corrections towards a Hebrew text (which would have had the Tetragrammaton). She also mentions Septuagint manuscripts that have Θεός and one that has παντοκράτωρ where the Hebrew text has the Tetragrammaton. She concludes: "It suffices to say that in old Hebrew and Greek witnesses, God has many names. Most if not all were pronounced till about the second century BCE. As slowly onwards there developed a tradition of non-pronunciation, alternatives for the Tetragrammaton appeared. The reading Adonai was one of them. Finally, before Kurios became a standard rendering Adonai, the Name of God was rendered with Theos." In the Book of Exodus alone, Θεός represents the Tetragrammaton 41 times.

Robert J. Wilkinson says that the Greek Minor Prophets Scroll from Nahal Hever is also a kaige recension and thus not strictly a Septuagint text.

Origen (Commentary on Psalms 2.2) said that in the most accurate manuscripts the name was written in an older form of the Hebrew characters, the paleo-Hebrew letters, not the square: "In the more accurate exemplars the (divine) name is written in Hebrew characters; not, however, in the current script, but in the most ancient." While Pietersma interprets this statement as referring to the Septuagint, Wilkinson says one might assume that Origen refers specifically to the version of Aquila of Sinope, which follows the Hebrew text very closely, but he may perhaps refer to Greek versions in general.

Manuscripts of the Septuagint and later Greek renderings 

The great majority of extant manuscripts of the Old Testament in Greek, complete or fragmentary, dated to the ninth century CE or earlier, employ Κύριος to represent the Tetragrammaton of the Hebrew text. The following do not. They include the oldest now extant.

 Manuscripts of the Septuagint or recensions thereof
 1st century BCE
 4QpapLXXLevb – fragments of the Book of Leviticus, chapters 1 to 5. In two verses: 3:12; 4:27 the Tetragrammaton of the Hebrew Bible is represented by Greek ΙΑΩ.
 Papyrus Fouad 266b (848) – fragments of Deuteronomy, chapters 10 to 33. The Tetragrammaton appears in square Hebrew/Aramaic script. According to a disputed view, the first copyist left a blank space marked with a dot, and another inscribed the letters.
 1st century CE
 Papyrus Oxyrhynchus 3522 – contains parts of two verses of chapter 42 of the Book of Job and has the Tetragrammaton in paleo-Hebrew letters.
 Greek Minor Prophets Scroll from Nahal Hever – in three fragments whose contents were published separately.
Se2grXII (LXXIEJ 12) has the Tetragrammaton in 1 place.
8HevXII a (LXXVTS 10a) in 24 places, in whole or part.
8HevXII b (LXXVTS 10b) in 4 places.
 1st to 2nd century
 Papyrus Oxyrhynchus 5101 – contains fragments of the Book of Psalms. It has YHWH in Paleo-Hebrew script.
 3rd century CE
 Papyrus Oxyrhynchus 1007 – contains Genesis 2 and 3. The divine name is written with a double yodh.
 Papyrus Oxyrhynchus 656 – fragments of the Book of Genesis, chapters 14 to 27. Has Κύριος where the first copyist left blank spaces
 Papyrus Berlin 17213 – fragments of the Book of Genesis, chapter 19. One space is left blank. Emanuel Tov thinks it indicated the end of a paragraph. It has been dated to 3rd century CE.
 Manuscripts of Greek translations made by Symmachus and Aquila of Sinope (2nd century CE)
 3rd century CE
 Papyrus Vindobonensis Greek 39777. Has the Tetragrammaton in archaic Hebrew script.
 5th century CE
 AqTaylor, this manuscript of the Aquila version is dated after the middle of the 5th century, but not later than the beginning of the 6th century.
 AqBurkitt – a palimpsest manuscript of the Aquila version dated late 5th century or early 6th century.
 Manuscripts with Hexaplaric elements
 6th century CE
 Codex Marchalianus – In addition to the Septuagint text of the prophets (with ), the manuscript contains marginal notes from a hand "not much later than the original scribe" indicating Hexaplaric variations, each identified as from Aquila, Symmachus or Theodotion. Marginal notes on some of the prophets contain πιπι to indicate that  in the text corresponds to the Tetragrammaton. Two marginal notes at Ezekiel 1:2 and 11:1 use the form  with reference to the Tetragrammaton.
 7th century CE
 Taylor-Schechter 12.182 – a Hexapla manuscript with Tetragrammaton in Greek letters ΠΙΠΙ. It has Hebrew text transliterated into Greek, Aquila, Symmachus and the Septuagint.
 9th century CE
 Ambrosiano O 39 sup. – the latest Greek manuscript containing the name of God is Origen's Hexapla, transmitting among other translations the text of the Septuagint, Aquila, Symmachus and Theodotion, and in three other unidentified Greek translations (Quinta, Sextus and Septima). This codex, copied from a much earlier original, comes from the late 9th century, and is stored in the Biblioteca Ambrosiana.

Patristic writings 

According to the Catholic Encyclopedia (1910) and B.D. Eerdmans:
 Diodorus Siculus (1st century BCE) writes  (Iao);
 Irenaeus (d. c. 202) reports that the Gnostics formed a compound  (Iaoth) with the last syllable of Sabaoth. He also reports that the Valentinian heretics use  (Iao);
 Origen (d. c. 254),  (Iao);
 Porphyry (d. c. 305) according to Eusebius (died 339),  (Ieuo);
 Jerome (died 420) speaks of certain Greek writers who misunderstood the Hebrew letters  (read right-to-left) as the Greek letters  (read left-to-right), thus changing YHWH to pipi.
(The latter is probably not  but  Ehyeh = "I am " or "I will be",  which the Jews counted among the names of God.)
 (Pseudo-)Jerome (4th/5th or 9th century),: IAHO. This work was traditionally attributed to Jerome and, in spite of the view of one modern writer who in 1936 said it is "now believed to be genuine and to be dated before CE 392" is still generally attributed to the 9th century and to be non-authentic.

Peshitta 
The Peshitta (Syriac translation), probably in the second century, uses the word "Lord" (pronounced māryā or moryo (Western pronunciation) for the Tetragrammaton.

Vulgate 
The Vulgate (Latin translation) made from the Hebrew in the 4th century CE, uses the word  ("Lord"), a translation of the Hebrew word Adonai, for the Tetragrammaton.

The Vulgate translation, though made not from the Septuagint but from the Hebrew text, did not depart from the practice used in the Septuagint. Thus, for most of its history, Christianity's translations of the Scriptures have used equivalents of Adonai to represent the Tetragrammaton. Only at about the beginning of the 16th century did Christian translations of the Bible appear combining the vowels of Adonai with the four (consonantal) letters of the Tetragrammaton.

Usage in religious traditions

Judaism

By at least the 3rd century BCE, the name was not pronounced in normal speech, but only in certain ritual contexts. The Talmud relays this change occurred after the death of Simeon the Just (either Simon I or his great-great-grandson Simon II). Philo calls the name ineffable, and says that it is lawful for those only whose ears and tongues are purified by wisdom to hear and utter it in a holy place (that is, for priests in the Temple). In another passage, commenting on : "If any one, I do not say should blaspheme against the Lord of men and gods, but should even dare to utter his name unseasonably, let him expect the penalty of death." Some time after the destruction of the Second Temple, the spoken use of God's name as it was written ceased altogether, though knowledge of the pronunciation was perpetuated in rabbinic schools.

Rabbinic sources suggest that the name of God was pronounced only once a year, by the high priest, on the Day of Atonement. Others, including Maimonides, claim that the name was pronounced daily in the liturgy of the Temple in the priestly blessing of worshippers, after the daily sacrifice; in synagogues, though, a substitute (probably "Adonai") was used. According to the Talmud, in the last generations before the fall of Jerusalem, the name was pronounced in a low tone so that the sounds were lost in the chant of the priests. Since the destruction of Second Temple of Jerusalem in 70 CE, the Tetragrammaton has no longer been pronounced in the liturgy. However the pronunciation was still known in Babylonia in the latter part of the 4th century.

Spoken prohibitions
The vehemence with which the utterance of the name is denounced in the Mishnah suggests that use of the name Yahweh was unacceptable in rabbinical Judaism. "He who pronounces the Name with its own letters has no part in the world to come!" Such is the prohibition of pronouncing the Name as written that it is sometimes called the "Ineffable", "Unutterable", or "Distinctive Name", or "Explicit Name" ("Shem HaMephorash" in Hebrew).

Halakha prescribes that although the Name is written  "yodh he waw he", if not preceded by "my Lord" then it is only to be pronounced "Adonai" and if preceded by "Adonai" then it is only to be pronounced as "Our God", or, in rare cases, as a repetition of Adonai, e.g., the Thirteen Attributes of Mercy in Exodus 34:6–7; the latter names too are regarded as holy names, and are only to be pronounced in prayer. Thus when someone wants to refer in third person to either the written or spoken Name, the term HaShem "the Name" is used; and this handle itself can also be used in prayer. The Masoretes added vowel points (niqqud) and cantillation marks to the manuscripts to indicate vowel usage and for use in ritual chanting of readings from the Bible in Jewish prayer in synagogues. To  they added the vowels for "" ("My Lord"), the word to use when the text was read. While "HaShem" is the most common way to reference "the Name", the terms "HaMaqom" (lit. "The Place", i.e. "The Omnipresent") and "Raḥmana" (Aramaic, "Merciful") are used in the mishna and gemara, still used in the phrases "HaMaqom y'naḥem ethḥem" ("may The Omnipresent console you"), the traditional phrase used in sitting Shiva and "Raḥmana l'tzlan" ("may the Merciful save us" i.e. "God forbid").

Written prohibitions

The written Tetragrammaton, as well as six other names of God, must be treated with special sanctity. They cannot be disposed of regularly, lest they be desecrated, but are usually put in long-term storage or buried in Jewish cemeteries in order to retire them from use. Similarly, writing the Tetragrammaton (or these other names) unnecessarily is prohibited, so as to avoid having them treated disrespectfully, an action that is forbidden. To guard the sanctity of the Name, sometimes a letter is substituted by a different letter in writing (e.g. יקוק), or the letters are separated by one or more hyphens, a practice applied also to the English name "God", which some Jews write as "G-d". Most Jewish authorities say that this practice is not obligatory for the English name.

Kabbalah

Kabbalistic tradition holds that the correct pronunciation is known to a select few people in each generation, it is not generally known what this pronunciation is.
There are two main schools of Kabbalah arising in 13th century Spain. These are called Theosophic Kabbalah represented by Rabbi Moshe De Leon and the Zohar, and the Kabbalah of Names or Prophetic Kabbalah whose main representative is Rabbi Abraham Abulafia of Saragossa. Rabbi Abulafia wrote many wisdom books and prophetic books where the name is used for meditation purposes from 1271 onwards. Abulafia put a lot of attention on Exodus 15 and the Songs of Moses. In this song it says "Yehovah is a Man of War, Yehovah is his name". For Abulafia the goal of prophecy was for a man to come to the level of prophecy and be called "Yehovah a man of war". Abulafia also used the tetragrammaton in a spiritual war against his spiritual enemies. For example, he prophesied in his book "The Sign", "Therefore, thus said YHWH, the God of Israel: Have no fear of the enemy" (See Hylton, A The Prophetic Jew Abraham Abulafia, 2015).

Moshe Chaim Luzzatto, says that the tree of the Tetragrammaton "unfolds" in accordance with the intrinsic nature of its letters, "in the same order in which they appear in the Name, in the mystery of ten and the mystery of four." Namely, the upper cusp of the Yod is Arich Anpin and the main body of Yod is and Abba; the first Hei is Imma; the Vav is Ze`ir Anpin and the second Hei is Nukvah. It unfolds in this aforementioned order and "in the mystery of the four expansions" that are constituted by the following various spellings of the letters:

ע"ב/`AV : יו"ד ה"י וי"ו ה"י, so called "`AV" according to its gematria value ע"ב=70+2=72.

ס"ג/SaG: יו"ד ה"י וא"ו ה"י, gematria 63.

מ"ה/MaH: יו"ד ה"א וא"ו ה"א, gematria 45.

ב"ן/BaN: יו"ד ה"ה ו"ו ה"ה, gematria 52.

Luzzatto summarises, "In sum, all that exists is founded on the mystery of this Name and upon the mystery of these letters of which it consists. This means that all the different orders and laws are all drawn after and come under the order of these four letters. This is not one particular pathway but rather the general path, which includes everything that exists in the Sefirot in all their details and which brings everything under its order."

Another parallel is drawn between the four letters of the Tetragrammaton and the Four Worlds: the י is associated with Atziluth, the first ה with Beri'ah, the ו with Yetzirah, and final ה with Assiah.

There are some who believe that the tetractys and its mysteries influenced the early kabbalists. A Hebrew tetractys in a similar way has the letters of the Tetragrammaton (the four lettered name of God in Hebrew scripture) inscribed on the ten positions of the tetractys, from right to left. It has been argued that the Kabbalistic Tree of Life, with its ten spheres of emanation, is in some way connected to the tetractys, but its form is not that of a triangle. The occult writer Dion Fortune says:

(The first three-dimensional solid is the tetrahedron.)

The relationship between geometrical shapes and the first four Sephirot is analogous to the geometrical correlations in tetractys, shown above under Pythagorean Symbol, and unveils the relevance of the Tree of Life with the tetractys.

Samaritans
The Samaritans shared the taboo of the Jews about the utterance of the name, and there is no evidence that its pronunciation was common Samaritan practice. However Sanhedrin 10:1 includes the comment of Rabbi Mana II, "for example those Kutim who take an oath" would also have no share in the world to come, which suggests that Mana thought some Samaritans used the name in making oaths. (Their priests have preserved a liturgical pronunciation "Yahwe" or "Yahwa" to the present day.) As with Jews, the use of Shema (שמא "the Name") remains the everyday usage of the name among Samaritans, akin to Hebrew "the Name" (Hebrew השם "HaShem").

Christianity

It is assumed that early Jewish Christians inherited from Jews the practice of reading "Lord" where the Tetragrammaton appears in the Hebrew text (and where a few Greek manuscripts use it in the midst of their Greek translation). Gentile Christians, primarily non-Hebrew speaking and using Greek Scripture texts, may have read Κύριος ("Lord"), as in the Greek text of the New Testament and in their copies of the Greek Old Testament. This practice continued into the Latin Vulgate where Dominus ("Lord") represented the Tetragrammaton in the Latin text. At the Reformation, the Luther Bible used capitalized Herr ("Lord") in the German text of the Old Testament to represent the Tetragrammaton.

In Christianity, when the Tetragrammaton is vocalized, the forms Yahweh or Jehovah are used. Jah or Yah is an abbreviation of Jahweh/Yahweh, and often sees usage by Christians in the interjection "Hallelujah", meaning "Praise Jah", which is used to give God glory.

Christian translations

Use of the Septuagint by Christians in polemics with Jews led to its abandonment by the latter, making it a specifically Christian text. From it Christians made translations into Coptic, Arabic, Slavonic and other languages used in Oriental Orthodoxy and the Eastern Orthodox Church, whose liturgies and doctrinal declarations are largely a cento of texts from the Septuagint, which they consider to be inspired at least as much as the Masoretic Text. Within the Eastern Orthodox Church, the Greek text remains the norm for texts in all languages, with particular reference to the wording used in prayers.

The Septuagint, with its use of Κύριος to represent the Tetragrammaton, was the basis also for Christian translations associated with the West, in particular the Vetus Itala, which survives in some parts of the liturgy of the Latin Church, and the Gothic Bible.

Christian translations of the Bible into English commonly use "" in place of the Tetragrammaton in most passages, often in small capitals (or in all caps), so as to distinguish it from other words translated as "Lord".

Eastern Orthodoxy
The Eastern Orthodox Church considers the Septuagint text, which uses Κύριος (Lord), to be the authoritative text of the Old Testament, and in its liturgical books and prayers it uses Κύριος in place of the Tetragrammaton in texts derived from the Bible.

Catholicism

In the Catholic Church, the first edition of the official Vatican Nova Vulgata Bibliorum Sacrorum Editio, editio typica, published in 1979, used the traditional Dominus when rendering the Tetragrammaton in the overwhelming majority of places where it appears; however, it also used the form Iahveh for rendering the Tetragrammaton in three known places:

 Exodus 3:15
 Exodus 15:3
 Exodus 17:15

In the second edition of the Nova Vulgata Bibliorum Sacrorum Editio, editio typica altera, published in 1986, these few occurrences of the form Iahveh were replaced with Dominus, in keeping with the long-standing Catholic tradition of avoiding direct usage of the Ineffable Name.

On 29 June 2008, the Holy See reacted to the then still recent practice of pronouncing, within Catholic liturgy, the name of God represented by the Tetragrammaton. As examples of such vocalisation it mentioned "Yahweh" and "Yehovah". It therefore directed that, "in liturgical celebrations, in songs and prayers the name of God in the form of the Tetragrammaton YHWH is neither to be used or pronounced"; and that translations of Biblical texts for liturgical use are to follow the practice of the Greek Septuagint and the Latin Vulgate, replacing the divine name with "the Lord" or, in some contexts, "God". The United States Conference of Catholic Bishops welcomed this instruction, adding that it "provides also an opportunity to offer catechesis for the faithful as an encouragement to show reverence for the Name of God in daily life, emphasizing the power of language as an act of devotion and worship".

Lutheranism and Anglicanism
In the Lutheran and Anglican psalters, the word  in "small capital letters [is used] to represent the tetragrammaton YHWH, the personal name of the deity". However, the Psalter of the 1979 Book of Common Prayer used by the Protestant Episcopal Church of the United States of America uses Yahweh in two places, Psalms 68:4 and Psalms 83:18. Also the Hymnal 1982 as used by the Episcopal Church utilizes the hymn, "Guide me, O thou great Jehovah", Hymn 690 The Christian Life. Aside from those instances,  is typically used in the Liturgy of the Episcopal Church.

Usage in art
Since the 16th century, artists have been using the tetragrammaton as a symbol for God, or for divine illumination. Protestant artists avoided to allegorize God in human form, but rather wrote the Hebrew name of God. This was done in book illustrations since 1530, then on coins and medals as well. Since the 17th century, both Protestant and Catholic artists have used the tetragrammaton in church decoration, on top of altars, or in center of frescos, often in rays of light or in a triangle.

See also
 Allah (the common Arabic word for God)
 I Am that I Am
 Muqattaʿat
 Names of God
 Names and titles of God in the New Testament
 List of Tetragrammatons in art in Austria

References

Notes

Citations

Sources

, reprinted in

External links

 
Kabbalistic words and phrases
Magic words
Yahweh
Sacred Name Movement

es:Yahveh#Escritura